In the House of Stone and Light is the debut album by Martin Page, released in 1994. It features the title song, "In the House of Stone and Light", which was a substantial Billboard Hot 100 hit (peaking at number 14) and AC (number 1) hit.

EPK
An EPK has been made for the album. It features Martin Page himself, lyricist Bernie Taupin, musician Robbie Robertson, and other friends of Page. In the EPK they talk about his past with his band, Q-Feel, his collaborations with Taupin, and the album and Page himself.

As stated in the EPK, "Shape the Invisible" is Page's favorite on his debut album. As described by him in his video EPK: "My favorite song is 'Shape the Invisible', purely because of what the lyrics say. I was reading a book about Leonardo DaVinci and he mentioned that this shape the invisible in a sentence, and I thought what a great title. And at the time I wrote the song, there is as there always is trouble in the world, and I really wrote it as a wish song."

Also stated in the EPK by Page, about the song "I Was Made For You": "I did a song called 'I Was Made For You' and that song has a distinct kind of Gaelic feel to it."

Taupin then adds, "'Light In My Heart' is a very simple song, I mean it's a very direct emotional piece of work." Page comments, "I feel very strong that 'Light In Your Heart' is one of Bernie's best lyrics."

Track listing
All tracks written by Martin Page, except tracks 6 and 9 (Martin Page/Bernie Taupin)

Personnel
Martin Page – All lead vocals, instrumentation as noted for individual tracks

"In the House of Stone and Light"
Martin Page – Bass, keyboards, guitars, programming, background vocals
Jimmy Copley – Drums
Paul Joseph Moore – Keyboards
Robbie Robertson – Guitar
Neil Taylor – Guitar
Bill Dillon – Guitar, mandolin, guitorgan
Geoffrey Oryema, Brenda Russell – Background vocals

"Shape the Invisible"
Martin Page – Bass, keyboards, guitar, programming, background vocals
Paul Joseph Moore – Keyboards
Neil Taylor – Guitar, ebow
Bill Dillon – Guitar, guitorgan
Jimmy Copley – Drums
Phil Collins – Additional drums

"I Was Made For You"
Martin Page – Bass, fretless bass, keyboards, programming, background vocals
Paul Joseph Moore – Keyboards
Neil Taylor – Guitar, ebow
Bill Dillon – Guitar, guitorgan
Phil Collins – Drums

"Keeper of the Flame"
Martin Page – Bass, keyboards, programming, background vocals, handclaps
Neil Taylor – Guitar
Bill Dillon – Guitar, guitorgan, mandolin
Jimmy Copley – Drums
Trevor Thornton – Tribal sidesticks, tambourine, handclaps
Geoffrey Oryema – Background vocals
Brian Fairweather, Diane Poncher, Susan Poncher – Handclaps

"In My Room"
Martin Page – Fretless bass, keyboards, acoustic piano, programming, background vocals
Neil Taylor – Guitar
Bill Dillon – Crying guitar, guitar, guitorgan
Brian Fairweather – Nylon string guitar
Trevor Thornton – Drums, tambourine

"Monkey in My Dreams"
Martin Page – Bass, keyboards, programming, handclaps, background vocals
Neil Taylor – Guitar
Bill Dillon – Rubber bass, guitar, guitorgan
Trevor Thornton – Live snare, tambourine, gong tom, sidesticks
Jack Hues – Background vocals

"Put on Your Red Dress"
Martin Page – Fretless bass, keyboards, guitar, programming, background vocals
Paul Joseph Moore – Keyboards
Neil Taylor – Guitar
Bill Dillon – Guitar, guitorgan, acoustic guitar
Jimmy Copley – Drums
Trevor Thornton – Tambourine

"Broken Stairway"
Martin Page – Acoustic piano, bass, fretless bass, keyboards
Jack Hues – Keyboards
Bill Dillon – Guitar, guitorgan

"Light in Your Heart"
Martin Page – Bass, keyboards, programming, background vocals
Neil Taylor – Guitar
Bill Dillon – Guitar, guitorgan
Phil Collins – Drums
Brenda Russell – Background vocals

"The Door"
Martin Page – Bass, keyboards, programming, background vocals
Jack Hues – Acoustic steel guitar, nylon string guitar
Neil Taylor – Guitar
Brian Fairweather – Nylon string guitar
Bill Dillon – Guitar, guitorgan, mandolin
Jimmy Copley – Drums
Trevor Thornton – Gong tom

Production
Arranged & Produced By Martin Page
Engineered By Jeff Lorenzen, Martin Page & Ed Thacker
Mixed By Mike Shipley; assisted by Kyle Bess, Bill Cooper, Greg Goldman & Rail Jon Rogut
Digital Editing By Jeff Lorenzen
Mastered By Dave Collins

References

1994 debut albums
Martin Page albums
Mercury Records albums